Enzo Celli is an Italian contemporary dancer, choreographer and dance company artistic director

Biography
Born in Sora, Italy, Celli received formal training as a breakdancer at the age of 19, and continued his studies as a self-taught artist. Celli's eagerness to learn later earned him a bachelor's degree in Human Movement Sciences from the Faculty of Psychology eCampus of Novedrate in Milan, Italy. Celli's artistic abilities and choreographic visions were supported and encouraged by renowned Italian arts critic, Vittoria Ottolenghi. Ottolenghi's interest in Celli was justified in 1995 when Celli founded, Botega, a rome-based dance company. Establishing himself as a dance educator and choreographer at the age of 26, Celli became the youngest choreographer funded by the Italian Government.

From 1996-2015, Celli and Botega toured internationally and performed works on theaters including: Alvin Ailey Citigroup Theatre in New York, La Cigale in Paris, Na Strastnom Theatre in Moscow, National Theatre of Belgrade in Serbia and Teatro Guaíra in Brazil. His studies and interests in contemporary dance intensified and kept bringing him back to New York City throughout the years. Teaching as a guest choreographer at places such as Sarah Lawrence College, Sam Houston State University, and Peridance Capezio Center. In 2013, Igal Perry commissioned Celli, Ohad Naharin, Dwight Rhoden and Sidra Bell to create a new work for Peridance Contemporary Dance Company.

His international engagements include: Bashkortostan State Academy in Russia, Universidade Federal de Minas Gerais in Brazil, National Choreographic Centre of Montpellier in Les Orsoline, France,  Erfurt Opera House in Germany, Centro ADAV in Ibiritè, Brazil, Espace Robert Hossein in Lourdes, France, La Versiliana Festival 2010 in Italy, and Expo 2012 in Yeosu, Korea.

In 2015, Celli founded his New York-based company VIVO Ballet and helped launch the VIVO Ballet Professional Training Center along with Elisabetta Minutoli, Associated Artistic Director of VIVO Ballet and wife of Enzo Celli. The VIVO Ballet Professional Training Center became a place of growth for what was becoming the VIVO Ballet Company.

In 2017 he was appointed personal adviser to the Mayor of Sora for major cultural projects. Also in 2017 is the director of the docufilm "Iùcela".

In 2018, Enzo Celli officially moved to New York to become an established American choreographer with his wife, and company dancer, Elisabetta Minutoli, and their son Emanuele. In May 2018 he was invited to be part of the INSPIRE ITALY roundtable at LaMaMa Culturehub and to hold a masterclass at the American Academy of Dramatic Arts during the European Month of Culture series in NYC. Celli currently is on faculty teaching classes at Peridance Capezio Center, Steps on Broadway, Gibney Dance, and Broadway Dance Center.

Below are some of the choreographer's most important works and collaborations:

June 2006 Celli was a collaborating choreographer for the event “L’amour et son amour, l’uomo che danza e la sua aspirazione” directed by Vittoria Ottolenghi and performed by the soloists Roberto Bolle, Vladimir Derevianko and Viviana Durante at Todi Festival. Also in June 2006, Botega Dance Company, together with Alvin Ailey Company, Bèjart Ballet, Bolshoi Ballet and Staatsballet München, joined the Dance Gala Amores as a guest company under the direction of Vittoria Ottolenghi.  2008 brought Celli to the Bashkir State Academy in the Republic of Bashkortostan (Ufa, Russia) to teach and collaborate with the Russian Drama Theatre. That was also the year that Botega performed Subway at La Cigale Theatre in Paris. In 2011, Botega Dance Company performed Fragile at the Russian Drama Theatre and at the Na Strastnom Theatre in Moscow. In September 2009, Enzo Celli was a resident choreographer at Topaz Art in New York and debuted at Versiliana Festival in August 2010 with his remake of Giselle. He was also a guest at the Erfurt Opera House (Germany) that same year. In 2012, his Company was a guest at Yesou (Korea) for Expo 2012.

VIVO Ballet 
VIVO Ballet was founded in 2015 by artistic director, Enzo Celli, and general manager of the VIVO Ballet Professional Training Center, Fulvio Pallisco. The team that launched VIVO Ballet was completed when associated artistic director, Elisabetta Minutoli, and communications director, Marco Sabbatini later joined. The founding team established two entities: VIVO Ballet, a New York-based dance company, and the VIVO Ballet Professional Training Center based in Rome.
Since its conception in 2015, VIVO Ballet has performed in international festivals in the US, France, Portugal, Switzerland, and Italy. With roots in Rome, the company sprouted within the Professional Training Center and then located to a more permanent home in New York City.

In 2018 VIVO Ballet presents itself as New York based contemporary dance company with a complete cast of 10 dancers and with Kalinda Santor as executive director.

References

Contemporary dance choreographers
Italian choreographers
Living people
1972 births